The 2d Intelligence Battalion (2d Intel) is a Marine Corps Intelligence military intelligence and counterintelligence unit based at Marine Corps Base Camp Lejeune. They provide the II Marine Expeditionary Force with intelligence products and analysis.

Mission
Plan and direct, collect, process, produce and disseminate intelligence, and provide counterintelligence support to the MEF Command Element, MEF major subordinate commands, subordinate Marine Air Ground Task Forces (MAGTF), and other commands as directed.

Subordinate units
 Headquarters and Service Company 
 Battlefield Surveillance Company
 Direct Support Company
 Intelligence Operations Company
 Counterintelligence Human Intelligence Company

Unit awards
A unit citation or commendation is an award bestowed upon an organization for the action cited. Members of the unit who participated in said actions are allowed to wear on their uniforms the awarded unit citation. 2nd Intel Battalion has been presented with the following awards:

See also

List of United States Marine Corps battalions
Organization of the United States Marine Corps

References
Notes

Web

 2nd Intel's official website
 Marine Parents Portal for 2d Intel Bn

Battalions of the United States Marine Corps